Moghai Ojah or Moghai Baruah (1916–1978) was a musician from Assam who popularized the Dhol of Assam to the world audience. Moghai Ojah had also acted in a few films, which include Pioli Phukan, Ranga Police, Pratidhwani, Mahut Bandhu Re (Bengali) and Maram Trishna.

Ojah was born in Naosolia Gaon, Jorhat, Assam in a family of Chutia ethnicity and died in Jorhat, Assam on 15 March 1978.

During his childhood, due to poverty, he had to work for sometime in a Tea Estate at Chenijan to earn his livelihood.

Srijanasom Trust, a charitable institution set up with an objective of promotion of Indian art and culture has instituted an award titled “Moghai Ojah Srijan Award” in memory of Moghai Ojah in 2015. First recipient of the award was prominent sattriya dance exponent Padmashri Jatin Goswami.

References

External links 
 Ganashilpi Moghai Oja Award to be presented to Nandi Saikia, The Sentinel, 2 March 2011
 Moghai Oja’s artistic contributions recalled, The Asaam Tribune, March 16, 2009.

1916 births
1978 deaths
People from Jorhat district
Musicians from Assam
Assamese actors
20th-century Indian musicians